Tirap can refer to:

 Tirap district, district in Arunachal Pradesh
 Tirap River, river that flows in Tirap district
 Tirap, Kenya
 TIRAP, toll-interleukin 1 receptor domain containing adaptor protein